Gillot or Gillott is a French surname. It may refer to:


Gillot
Claude Gillot (1673–1722), French painter
Dominique Gillot (born 1949), French politician
Firmin Gillot (c. 19th century), French inventor and photoengraver
Francis Gillot (born 1960 ), French footballer and manager
François-Xavier Gillot (1842–1910), French physician, mycologist, and botanist
Jacques Gillot (born 1948), Guadeloupean politician
Jacques Gillot (jurist) (c. 1550–1619), French priest and jurist
Marie-Agnès Gillot (born 1974 or 1975), Parisian ballet dancer and choreographer

Gillott
Eric Gillott (born 1951), New Zealand cricketer
Jacky Gillott (1939–1980), English novelist and broadcaster
Joseph Gillott (1799–1873), English pen-maker and art patron
Samuel Gillott (1838–1913), Australian lawyer and politician

See also
Gillotts School, a secondary school in Oxfordshire, U.K.